Cosmosoma beatrix is a moth of the family Erebidae. It was described by Herbert Druce in 1884. It is found in Panama and Costa Rica.

References

beatrix
Moths described in 1884